Chen Fook Chye is a Malaysian politician from DAP. He was the Member of Perak State Legislative Assembly for Keranji from 2004 to 2018.

Politics 
On 23 March 2022, DAP Perak state Chairman, Nga Kor Ming announced that Chen had voluntarily decided not to seek re-election in the 2018 Malaysian general election.

Election results

References 

Democratic Action Party (Malaysia) politicians
Living people
Malaysian politicians of Chinese descent
Year of birth missing (living people)